Naked Truth is an American rock band from Atlanta, Georgia. The group originated in the local hardcore scene in 1988, although the individual band members were born in from various locations: vocalist Doug Watts came from Detroit, bassist Jeff from Harlem, New York, and drummer Bernard Dawson from Los Angeles, with Jimmie Westley as the only Georgia native, from Savannah.

The dreadlocked group's singer came to the notice of Bernie Rhodes, and the band signed a recording contract with Sony. They relocated to London, saw their bassist depart due to homesickness and recruited the London-born Kwame Boaten. Green With Rage (1991) was a mini-album which introduced Naked Truth's raw, aggressive sound. They followed that release with another EP, Read Between the Lines.

The band supported Little Angels on tour, and they built a cult following enhanced by gigs in London.  The album, Fight, was released by Sony in 1993, mixing genres such as jazz and death metal.  A proposed name change to Watts coincided with Sony's decision to drop the outfit from its roster.

References

Other sources

Allmusic biography

Heavy metal musical groups from Georgia (U.S. state)
Musical groups from Atlanta
Sony Music artists